David Gold (born 1 January 1993) is a Scottish professional footballer who plays for Arbroath as a midfielder.

He has previously played for Hibernian, Queen's Park, Cowdenbeath and Berwick Rangers.

References

1993 births
Living people
Scottish footballers
Hibernian F.C. players
Queen's Park F.C. players
Cowdenbeath F.C. players
Berwick Rangers F.C. players
Arbroath F.C. players
Scottish Professional Football League players
Association football midfielders